James Paul Councill Jr. (December 12, 1921 – March 25, 2007) was an American politician.

References

External links

1921 births
2007 deaths
Democratic Party members of the Virginia House of Delegates
20th-century American politicians
21st-century American politicians